John Docherty may refer to:
John Docherty (footballer, born 1940), Scottish football player and manager
John Docherty (footballer, born 1935), Scottish football wing half
John Docherty (boxer) (born 1997), British boxer
Jack Docherty (John Docherty, born 1962), Scottish actor, writer, presenter and performer

See also
John Doherty (disambiguation)